Netaji Subhas Chandra Bose Stadium is a multi-purpose stadium in Hailakandi, Assam, India. The stadium is mainly used for football and cricket matches. 

It is named after the Indian freedom fighter Netaji Subhas Chandra Bose. The stadium is mainly used for football, but earlier hosted three cricket matches.

References

Cricket grounds in Assam
Football venues in Assam
Hailakandi
Memorials to Subhas Chandra Bose
Multi-purpose stadiums in India
Sports venues in Assam
2005 establishments in Assam
Sports venues completed in 2005